Pervomaysky District is an administrative and municipal district (raion), one of the fifty-nine in Altai Krai, Russia. It is located in the northeast of the krai. Its administrative center is the town of Novoaltaysk (which is not administratively a part of the district). Population:

Administrative and municipal status
Within the framework of administrative divisions, Pervomaysky District is one of the fifty-nine in the krai. The town of Novoaltaysk serves as its administrative center, despite being incorporated separately as a town of krai significance—an administrative unit with the status equal to that of the districts.

As a municipal division, the district is incorporated as Pervomaysky Municipal District. The town of krai significance of Novoaltaysk is incorporated separately from the district as Novoaltaysk Urban Okrug.

References

Notes

Sources

Districts of Altai Krai

